Stanley Elton Hollis VC (21 September 1912 – 8 February 1972) was a British recipient of the Victoria Cross, the highest and most prestigious award for gallantry in the face of the enemy that can be awarded to British and Commonwealth forces.

He had the distinction of receiving the only Victoria Cross awarded on D-Day (6 June 1944).

Background
Stanley Hollis was born in Middlesbrough, North Riding of Yorkshire, England, where he lived and attended the local school until 1926; when his parents (Edith and Alfred Hollis) moved to Robin Hood's Bay, where he worked in his father's fish and chip shop.

In 1929 he was apprenticed to a Whitby shipping company, to learn to be a Navigation Officer. He made regular voyages to West Africa; but in 1930 fell ill with blackwater fever, which ended his merchant navy career. Returning to North Ormesby, Middlesbrough he worked as a lorry driver, and married Alice Clixby with whom he had a son and a daughter.

Military career
In 1939 he enlisted in the Territorial Army, part of the British Army, in the 4th Battalion, Green Howards. At the outbreak of World War II he was mobilised and transferred to the 6th Battalion, Green Howards and went to France as part of the British Expeditionary Force in 1940, where he served as the commanding officer's despatch rider. He was promoted from lance corporal to sergeant during the evacuation from Dunkirk. He then fought from El Alamein to Tunis as part of the British Eighth Army in the North African Campaign. He was promoted to company sergeant major shortly before the invasion of Sicily in 1943, where he was wounded at the battle of Primosole Bridge.

On D-Day, the 6th Green Howards landed on Gold Beach. As his company moved inland from the beaches after the initial landings, Hollis went with his company commander to investigate two German pillboxes which had been by-passed. He rushed the first, taking all but five of the occupants prisoner; and then dealt with the second, taking 26 prisoners. He next cleared a neighbouring trench. Later that day, he led an unsuccessful attack on an enemy position containing a field gun and multiple MG 42 machine guns. After withdrawing, he learned that two of his men had been left behind; and said to his commanding officer, Major Lofthouse: "I took them in. I will try to get them out." Taking a grenade from one of his men, Hollis carefully observed the enemy's pattern of behaviour and threw it at the most opportune moment. Unfortunately, he had failed to prime the grenade; but the enemy did not know that, and kept their heads down waiting for it to explode. By the time they had realised their mistake Hollis was on top of them, and had shot them down.

In September 1944 he was wounded in the leg and evacuated to England, where he was decorated by King George VI on 10 October 1944.

Citation

Hollis was 31 years old, and a Warrant Officer Class II (Company Sergeant-Major) in the 6th Battalion, The Green Howards, British Army during the Second World War when the following deed took place for which he was awarded the VC:

Later life
After the war, he worked for a time as a sandblaster in a local steelworks. He then became a partner in a motor repair business in Darlington, before becoming a ship's engineer from 1950 to 1955. He next trained as a publican, and ran the 'Albion' public house in Market Square, North Ormesby: the pub's name was changed to 'The Green Howard'. After the pub was demolished in 1970, he moved to become the tenant of the 'Holywell View' public house at Liverton Mines near Loftus.

He died on 8 February 1972, and was laid to rest in Acklam Cemetery, Middlesbrough.

Legacy

Hollis Crescent, a military accommodation estate, was named after him in the 1980s/90s in Strensall, North Yorkshire. A memorial plaque was put on the side of number 2 Hollis Crescent to commemorate his Victoria Cross. 

A statue honouring him, sculpted by Brian Alabaster ARBS, was unveiled on 26 November 2015 by Vice Lord Lieutenant of North Yorkshire, Peter Scrope. The walk-in memorial is located close to the Middlesbrough cenotaph outside the gates of Albert Park in front of the Dorman Museum.

Hollis Court, a retired/sheltered accommodation complex in Coulby Newham, Middlesbrough is named after him.

His Victoria Cross was bought by medal collector Sir Ernest Harrison OBE, chairman of Racal and Vodafone. Harrison presented the medal to the Green Howards Regimental Museum in Richmond, North Yorkshire in 1997. Ten years later, he purchased, for the Green Howards, the Normandy hut which Hollis had attacked.

In 2016, a school in Middlesbrough that converted to academy status, was named Hollis Academy, in his honour.

References

Bibliography
British VCs of World War 2 (John Laffin, 1997)
D-day Victoria Cross: Story of Sergeant Major Stanley Hollis, VC (Philip Wilkinson, 1997)
Monuments to Courage (David Harvey, 1999)
The Register of the Victoria Cross (This England, 1997)

External links

The Green Howards Hollis Memorial - Hollis Hut, Ver-sur-Mer
Location of grave and VC medal (Cleveland)
News Item (VC medal donation to regimental museum)
D-Day  (highly detailed site on the D-Day landings)
 

Press articles
Revealed: How statue of Middlesbrough D-Day hero Stan Hollis is to look
The Stanley E. Hollis VC Memorial Fund

1912 births
1972 deaths
Burials in North Yorkshire
People from Middlesbrough
Green Howards soldiers
British Army personnel of World War II
British World War II recipients of the Victoria Cross
British Army recipients of the Victoria Cross
British Battle of Normandy recipients of the Victoria Cross
Military personnel from Yorkshire